Bathymophila aages is a species of sea snail, a marine gastropod mollusk in the family Solariellidae.

Description
The size of the shell attains 4.6 mm.

Distribution
This marine species occurs off Indonesia.

References

 Vilvens, 2009, New species and new records of Solariellidae (Gastropoda: Trochoidea) from Indonesia and Taiwan. 90–91, figs.72–74; Novapex v. 10

External links

aages
Gastropods described in 2009